Circus (Swedish: Cirkus) is a 1939 Danish-Swedish drama film directed by George Schnéevoigt and starring Carl Ström, Gösta Cederlund and Tollie Zellman. It was shot at the studios of Nordisk Film in Valby.

Plot summary

Cast
 Carl Ström as 	Magnus Bohlin
 Gösta Cederlund as 	Hjalmar Bohlin
 Tollie Zellman as 	Olivia
 Ellen Løjmar as 	Paula Bohlin
 Nils Kihlberg as 	Ernst
 Viveka Linder asKarin
 Ragnar Planthaber as 	Lille Alfredo
 Bror Bügler as 	Bengt Strömberg
 Henrik Schildt asOscar Svensson
 Fritiof Billquist asGeorg Jansson
 Peter Höglund as	Hasse Jansson
 Eric Malmberg as 	Hollander
 Victor Montell as 	Maurice Dupont
 Ruth Stevens as 	Hanna

References

Bibliography 
 Krawc, Alfred. International Directory of Cinematographers, Set- and Costume Designers in Film: Denmark, Finland, Norway, Sweden (from the beginnings to 1984). Saur, 1986.

External links 
 

1939 films
1939 drama films
Danish drama films
Swedish drama films
1930s Swedish-language films
Films directed by George Schnéevoigt
1930s Swedish films